Nai Abadi Sahiwal is a green town in Sahiwal District, Pakistan.

References

Unscheduled outages SAHIWAL, Dec 30, 2006

Populated places in Sahiwal District